Lam Nam Yang is a watercourse of Thailand. It is a tributary of the Chi River.

Yang